The River Brent is a river in west and northwest London, England, and a tributary of the River Thames.  in length, it rises in the Borough of Barnet and flows in a generally south-west direction before joining the Tideway stretch of the Thames at Brentford.

Hydronymy and etymology 
A letter from the Bishop of London in 705 suggesting a meeting at Breġuntford, now Brentford, is the earliest record of this place and probably therefore that of the river, suggesting that the name may be related to the Celtic *brigant- meaning "high" or "elevated" perhaps linked to the goddess Brigantia

Geology, topography and natural history

The River Thames can first be identified as a discrete drainage line as early as 58 million years ago, in the Thanetian stage of the late Palaeocene epoch. Until around half a million years ago, the Thames flowed on its existing course through what is now Oxfordshire, before turning to the north east through Hertfordshire and East Anglia to reach the North Sea near Ipswich. At this time the river system headwaters lay in the English West Midlands and may, at times, have received drainage from the North Wales Berwyn Mountains. The River Brent and adjacent tributaries the Colne Brook and those downstream such as the River Lea either flowed into this more northern Thames or formed the early course of the present day river Thames.

The arrival of an ice sheet in the Quaternary Ice Age, about 450,000 years ago, dammed the river in Hertfordshire causing large ice lakes which eventually burst their banks and caused the river to be diverted onto its present course through London. Progressively in this Ice Age, the northern channel was pushed south to form a lake, now the St Albans depression, by the repeated advances of the ice sheet. This created pressure to form the Goring Gap and a new river route through Berkshire, joining with the Kennet that formed the early southern headwater and on into London after which the river rejoined its original course in southern Essex, near the present River Blackwater estuary.  Here it entered a substantial freshwater lake in the southern North Sea basin.  A torrent produced by the rupture of this lake (now a sea) was a major cause of the formation of the Dover Strait gap between Britain and France.  Subsequent development led to the continuation of the course which the river follows at the present day.

Most of the bedrock of the Vale of Aylesbury is largely made up of clay and chalk that was formed at the end of the ice age and at one time was under the Proto-Thames, creating vast underground reserves of water that make the water table higher than average in the Vale of Aylesbury from Thame to Hemel Hempstead.

The last advance from that Scandinavian ice flow to have reached this far south covered much of north west Greater London  and finally forced the proto-Thames to take roughly its present course. At the height of the last ice age, and until around 10,000 BCE, Britain was connected to mainland Europe by a large marshy expanse of land known as Doggerland in the southern North Sea basin.  This forced flow southwards from the eastern Essex coast where it met the Rhine, the Meuse and the Scheldt flowing from what are now the Netherlands and Belgium. These rivers formed a single river—the Channel River (Fleuve Manche) that passed through the Dover Strait and drained into the Atlantic Ocean in the western English Channel.

The ice sheet which stopped near Finchley deposited Boulder clay to form Dollis Hill and Hanger Hill. Its torrent of meltwater gushed through the Finchley Gap and south towards the new course of the Thames, and proceeded to carve out the Brent Valley in the process. Upon the valley sides there can be seen other terraces of Brickearth; laid over and sometimes interlayered with the clays. These deposits were brought in by the winds during the periglacial periods, suggesting that wide flat marshes were then part of the landscape, which the new river Brent proceeded to cut down.  The steepness of the valley sides is witness to the very much lower mean sea levels caused by glaciation locking up so much water on land masses, the potential energy causing the river water to flow rapidly seaward and so erode its bed quickly downwards.

The surface had sandy deposits from an ancient sea, laid over sedimentary clay (this is the Blue London Clay). All the erosion down from this higher land surface and sorting action by these changes of water flow and direction, formed what is known as the Thames River Gravel Terraces. Since Roman times and perhaps earlier, however, the isostatic rebound from the weight of previous ice sheets, and its interplay with the eustatic change in sea level, means that the old valley of the river Brent, together with that of the Thames, has been silting up again. Thus, along much of the Brent's present day course one can make out the water meadows of rich alluvium, which is augmented by frequent floods.

Human history

Pre-Roman to Norman history
So extensive have the changes to this landscape been that what little evidence there is of man's presence before the ice came has inevitably shown signs of transportation here by water and reveals nothing specifically local. Likewise, later evidence of occupation, even since the arrival of the Romans, may lie next to the original banks of the Brent but have been buried under centuries of silt.

The most prominent pre-Roman settlement on the River Brent was apparently at Brentford. This Bronze Age site pre-dates the Roman occupation of Britain, and thus predates the founding of London itself. Many pre-Roman artifacts have been excavated in and around the area in Brentford known as 'Old England'. The quality and quantity of the artefacts suggests that Brentford was a meeting point for pre-Roman tribes. One well-known Iron Age piece from about 100 BC to AD 50 is the Brentford horncap - a ceremonial chariot fitting that formed part of local antiquarian Thomas Layton's collection, now held by the Museum of London. Odd Roman artifacts have also been found by the River Brent in both Brentford and Hanwell, suggesting that a trading route may have used the river to trade with the early villages in Roman and post-Roman times.

However, can the river Brent be considered a border in the sense that the quality it possessed of dividing the land was notable enough to be given such a descriptive title?  The Brent river valley in 705 would have looked very different to today. Before modern day dredging, the river was wider and shallower. Before the construction of its weirs, the Brent reservoir and Grand Union Canal (and its Paddington Branch, which takes much of the Brent's waters) the river would have flooded more frequently than it does today. The alluvial valley floor would therefore have been swamp.  On Google Earth, the signs of many of the old drainage channels that turned the marsh into water meadow are still visible. Bordering these marshes would have been dense thickets of thorn and willow. A link can be made with the local area, the south-west plains of Middlesex, forming the Anglo-Saxon founded Hundreds of Elthorne [shelter tree, from Helethorne with the 'h' being lost to elision], and Spelthorne (perhaps speech/discourse tree).

The earliest surviving reference to the then village of Hanwell is in 959, when it is recorded as Hanewelle in pledge, when Alfwyn (a Saxon) pawned his land for money to go on a pilgrimage. It was only a small hamlet on the river banks in the 10th century.

Another conjecture is that one of the possible etymologies given for this ancient parish of Hanwell is 'Han' as Saxon for boundary stone and 'well' as Saxon for fresh water or spring. The Rectory Cottage to the parish church of St Mary has a large stone of about a ton in its garden.  A large land owner and historian also put forward the observation that this appeared to line up with what he maintained as traces of the parish being divided up into the Roman Centuria unit of land area, indicating that they used this stone as a datum. However, the position of the field boundaries and roads still wait to be statistically analysed to test this hypothesis.

Nevertheless, a cursory inspection of old Ordnance Survey maps, blended with an appreciation of how hedges and boundary paths drift with time and use,  strongly  suggests that they approximated to dimensions of the quintarial  limes of the Roman field system by a degree that far exceeds what  would be expected by chance alone.  Hanwell parish was very narrow in the east–west direction.  The letter of 705 calling a meeting at Brentford to resolve a dispute between the East Saxons and the West Saxons; as early as this the Brent was recognised as a convenient halfway point or boundary.  Other later historically important meetings are also recorded here.

Going back a little further, etymological evidence of the West Saxons renaming settlements to the west including the Chilterns to the north west can be seen in their many place name endings such as field, ham, ton, and worth but at the Brent they almost stop — the course of the river presenting a boundary between lands named by the invading Saxons to the west and lands retaining the last vestiges of Romano-British London which lasted until the end of the 5th century, having in many cases, older names.

Evidence of Roman settlement, that was discovered by the Hendon and District Archaeological Society and others exists in an urn burial of a headless child was found in nearby Sunny Hill Park.  Hendon manor is described in Domesday (1087), but the Anglo-Saxon name [æt þǣm] hēam dūne meaning '[at the] high hill', is earlier.

Post-Norman history
The course of the river has demarcated sub-tribal then administrative divisions. It marked the boundary of Middlesex and Hertfordshire and at a lower, less important level, Gore Hundred and the Liberty of St Albans (also known as the Hundred of Cashio).

By the Middle Ages malaria had reached Britain: locally endemic in the south. The main instances were among shepherds (shearing marsh wool) and fishermen along the Thames as well as at Romney Marsh, following which the major lower Thames tributaries may have been seen for a time as unhealthy for settlement on their immediate banks; many adages of marsh and bog may date to this period. At places where river gravel beds formed a firm river bed fording was safe. Some such fording places were the Roman road crossing in Brentford itself, elevated to the status of a bridge in medieval times, in part funded by a small tax on Jews crossing the bridge, Green Lanes in Hanwell (a reminder that this was an old droving route, the word 'green' signifying that livestock could graze whilst on their last journey), and Hanwell Bridge on the Uxbridge Road. With only a few fordable places along the river's course, this presented an ideal natural defensive barrier.

The original parish of Hanwell took in Boston Manor and Brentford, running three and a half miles north from the river's discharge but about one seventh the width. It separated the curacy of Norwood Green (west) and Ealing (specifically Gunnersbury manor) east. To the north it bordered Greenford and Perivale also using the river. The river's line, before the draining of the marshes, formed a natural boundary between the different pre- and post-Roman tribes of the south-east of England.

Certain accounts of the Romantic Period have speculation from its propensity to suggest regular links to druids, or of some other ancient religious deity, all which alluded more to fancy with which to delight the readers of the new vogue in travelogues, rather than the result of any serious study, the true history of the river Brent from these cannot be made out.

The London Borough of Brent derived its name from the river when in 1965 the boroughs of Willesden and Wembley chose a name when uniting. This is also reflected in the coat of arms of the borough, showing a stylized river in the shield.

Earliest recorded reference
Brentford was a likely site of a battle recorded by Julius Cæsar between Julius Cæsar and local king, Cassivellaunus, in 54 BC.

A letter from the Bishop of London in 705 suggesting a meeting at Breguntford, now Brentford, is the earliest record of this place and of the river.

River's course

From source and Dollis Brook to Brent Reservoir

The River Brent starts as the junction of Dollis Brook and Mutton Brook close to Bridge Lane in Hendon, in the London Borough of Barnet.

It then turns south and passes between Totteridge and Whetstone. A tributary, Folly Brook, meets the Dollis not far from Woodside Park tube station. The Dollis then flows through Church End, Finchley, to Hendon.

Mutton Brook rises in Cherry Tree Wood, East Finchley. It flows westward, underground, until it comes to the surface shortly after The Bishop's Avenue, and then flows through parks next to Lyttelton Road, Falloden Way and North Circular Road to meet the Dollis.

A small stream called Decoy Brook rises in Turner's Wood in Hampstead Garden Suburb and runs through Temple Fortune to join the Brent at Riverside Drive in Hendon. Another, Clitterhouse Stream, rises at two locations on the western slopes of Hampstead Heath. One brook feeds the Leg of Mutton Pond on West Heath, and the lower duck pond of Golders Hill Park.  On the bank of the stream by Leg of Mutton Pond lies the site of a Stone Age encampment, which was excavated by the Hendon and District Archaeological Society in the 1970s.  Another brook feeds the upper duck pond in Golders Hill Park and then flows to merge with the other branch at the lower duck pond.  From Golders Hill Park the stream flows underground approximately in parallel with Dunstan Road to Childs Hill Park.  At Granville Road, at the south end of the park, a laundry industry once used the clean water of the stream as did a nursery industry, now all disappeared.  From Granville Road the stream flows underground to emerge at Clitterhouse Playing Fields and joins the Brent at Brent Cross shopping centre.

The River Brent flows alongside the A406 North Circular Road through Brent Park and then under the Northern line to Brent Cross and the Brent Reservoir, where it is joined by another tributary, the Silk Stream. There are several feeders to the Silk Stream including Burnt Oak Brook, Edgware Brook and Deans Brook.

From Brent Reservoir to Brentford
From here, still closely following the North Circular Road, the river passes Stonebridge Park station, where it is joined by Wembley (Rowlands) Brook, which rises in Vale farm near Sudbury. The river continues under an aqueduct carrying the Paddington Arm of the Grand Union Canal. From Stonebridge Park the river turns westward, and flows under the A40 Western Avenue, past the Lilburne walk into Tokyngton Recreation Ground in Harlesden, and through the adjacent Brent River Park for three miles until it reaches Perivale. It then runs through Perivale Park past the local running track and under the railway bridge and into Stockdove Way crossing Argyle Road at the traffic lights into Perivale Lane, where it joins up with the foot/cyclepath at St Mary's the Virgin Perivale through to Pitshanger Park.  The river runs through Longfield / Perivale East Meadow and Pitshanger Riverside meadows.

This part of the river, as it passes through the southern boundary of Perivale Park Golf Course, is joined from the north by Costons Brook. It was dredged deeper in the 1960s and a control weir built, to reduce the risk of flooding, especially of Costons Lane, along which there is a flood protection wall. Previously, Ruislip Road East would also regularly become impassable.

The river then swings south again at Greenford Bridge to Hanwell, a mile away across the fields. The river runs by the local cyclepath, along the northern pavement over Greenford Bridge and into Costons Lane before turning eastwards into Perivale Park.

The river continues southeastward past St. Mary's Church. It flows under the Great Western Railway at the 900-foot-long (270 m) Wharncliffe Viaduct, a high spanned railway viaduct carrying the main-line railway from Paddington to the west of England.

From here, the Brent is canalised and navigable — the river and canal pass through Osterley Lock (98), Clitheroe's Lock (99) and Brentford Gauging Locks (100). It finally joins the tidal River Thames at Thames tidal locks - 101 in Old Brentford, a mile upstream of Kew Bridge.

The river intersects with the north to south Capital Ring, Section 8, which runs alongside it from Osterley Lock to Greenford.

Industrial heritage

Brentford Dock

Brentford Dock in west London was a major transshipment point between the Great Western Railway (GWR) and barges on the River Thames. The building of Brentford Dock was started in 1855 and it was formally opened in 1859. The dock yard was redeveloped in 1972 and is now Brentford Dock Marina and Brentford Dock Estate.

Brent Reservoir 

The Brent Reservoir (popularly called the Welsh Harp Reservoir) is a reservoir which straddles the boundary between the London boroughs of Brent and Barnet and is owned by British Waterways. The reservoir takes its informal name from a public house called The Welsh Harp, which stood nearby until the early 1970s.

In a recent survey, a large number fish were captured in the reservoir and adjoining parts of the River Brent and Silk Stream, 95% of which were Roach. However, fishing is prohibited in the reservoir itself.

The plans for the construction laid in 1803 were abandoned because of cost, but by 1820 there was not enough water to supply the Grand Union Canal and the Regent's Canal, so under an Act of Parliament in 1819, the Regent's Canal Company decided to dam the River Brent and create a reservoir in order to guarantee a sufficient water supply for their canals during drier weather, an accidental  damming of the feeder streams  and similar times of need.

The reservoir was constructed by William Hoof between 1834 and 1835. The water flooded much of Cockman's Farm, to supply the Regent's Canal at Paddington. It was called "Kingsbury Reservoir" and its  spread between Old Kingsbury Church and Edgware Road. Hoof, who was awarded the tender for the work (including the construction of a bridge) received the sum of £2,740 6s. In August 1835, a few months before completion, four brothers named Sidebottom drowned in an accident.

The Welsh Harp Conservation Group (WHCG) managed in 1972 to fight off a local development plan. The WHCG organises management work, such as annual refurbishment of the tern rafts and works with Brent and Barnet councils on the site's  management, including applying for National Lottery bids.

Parks and nature reserves

Lower Dollis Brook SINC

Soon after its source in Hendon the river runs through Brent Park (Hendon), and the park and the first part of the river until it passes under the Northern line are part of the Lower Dollis Brook Site Borough of Importance for Nature Conservation, Grade II.

Brent River Park

Brent River Park is one of London's larger urban green spaces. The natural landscape has recently been improved through the River Brent Project and further plans are proposed for future improvements. A new cycle path and wildlife conservation areas were opened in 2008. The borough's riverside park land community space will have its suitability for informal ball games improved over the next few years under the River Brent Project. The spaces are also popular with local dog walkers, children people out walking and local nature lovers.

The whole of Brent River Park/ River Brent Park area is now designated as a nature conservation area and was so popular it received the Mayor of London's seal of approval by winning £400,000 for park projects and improvements in 2009, through the mayoral assembly's West London Priority Parks Award. The park is now full of flora and fauna, along with its adjacent meadows and colonies of bats.

Perivale East Meadow and Pitshanger Riverside Meadows

The three meadows of Longfield/Perivale East Meadow and Pitshanger Riverside Meadows (part of Brent River Park) with natural riverbanks form part of the River Brent flood plain home to mallard ducks, moorhens, kingfishers and grey wagtails. Herons can also be seen along the river. It also passes through Perivale Park, which has had a few herons recently.

Tokyngton Park

The River Brent also enters Tokyngton Park in Tokyngton, Brent. The extensive flood prevention work undertaken during both the 1940s and 1970s, had led to this section of river in Tokyngton Park in Tokyngton, Brent, being straightened and enclosed in concrete. The river thus provided little or no recreational value to the local populace, whilst the quality of wildlife habitat was poor. During 1999, a local partnership was formed between the local authority, the Environment agency, local community groups and local firms, to implement improvements to the park for both people and wildlife.

The park can be accessed either locally by foot or via an official urban walking route from Hanwell railway station and Brent Lodge Park; Perivale tube or most stops served by the 95 bus service. Car parking is plentiful in the streets adjacent to Hanwell railway station. To return to the start of the walk, take the 95 bus from Western Avenue to Greenford Red Lion, then the E3 bus to Hanwell railway station. Public toilets can be found in Brent Lodge Park.

Brent Lodge Park and the Churchfields

Brent Lodge Park (or BLP) and Churchfields, which is located The Brent River Park, is a pocket of the countryside within the now urban environment of the London Borough of Ealing. the park is bordered by the River Brent on the west and south and has become one of the favourite places for locals to go for tranquillity and chilling out.

The park got an EU/Department for Communities and Local Government Green Flag Award in 2009. Brent River and Canal Society with local park ranger Tony Ord look after the park.

Brent Lodge Park and the Churchfields is another park along the course of the river as it passes through Ealing. The park is accessible  from Hanwell train station by either the  E3 and E1 on bus stops on  Greenford Avenue, then the 83, 92, 195, 207, 282, 427 and 607 stops on the Uxbridge Road and Ealing Hospital, or a short walk to the entrance on the land by the hospital or via West Middlesex Golf Course. Vehicular parking is limited within the car park at the end of Church Road and parking along Church Road being restricted during summer and weekends. The hospital's park is only for the hospital staff, patients and visitors to use.

It contains both public toilets, a café, animal centre and Millennium maze. The extensive hay meadows and grand trees making it a great place to spot many forms of fauna and flora.

Within the bounds of the site there is a grade 2 listed stable block (it contains an animal centre) which is the only remains of the old manor house, which sadly burned down in the 1930s.

Wembley riverside walk 
A public riverside walk (Wembley riverside walk) leads to Wembley Stadium. The River Brent & Grand Union Canal Circular Tour and Ealing Cycling Campaign Routes and Rides follow part of the River Brent.  Where the route follows the River Brent, it does so as closely as possible on well-made paths and roads.

Notable buildings

Ealing Hospital was re-built near the banks of the River Brent in the 1970s, on the same site as St Bernard's Hospital, dating back to 1832 (as Hanwell Asylum).

Within the bounds of the site of Brent Lodge Park and the Churchfields there is a grade 2 listed stable block (it contains an animal centre) which is the only remains of the old manor house, which sadly  burned down in the 1930s.

Environmental issues

Pollution
River Brent was badly polluted since 1886 after contamination caused by sewage disposal outlets, rubber works and the early oil industry. The more recent rise in the rate of motor traffic has also become a major reason behind modern day, upstream pollution.

High sewerage levels had killed off the local trout at Brentford by the early 1920s. The river was cleaned out and the sewerage sent into a separate underground pipe by World War II. A few trout began to return in the 1990s.

The water quality upstream in the River Brent, and urban diffuse pollution, which has affected biological oxygen levels in Ealing 
and the area in Brent is affected by diffuse urban pollution and drain misconnections as of 2010.

The Silk Stream tributary was still the victim of at least one sewerage outflow pipe in 2010.

Thames Water was called in 2010 to replace a collapsed sewer pipe in Queens Walk, Ealing but found that a stretch of town houses were in fact not properly connected to the sewerage system when they had been built in 2000; for 10 years their effluent had been carried into the River Brent. The Environment Agency's, environment management team leader, Sarah Mills, said: "Approximately eight to nine town houses have been found to be misconnected, which Thames Water have advised would have occurred when they were built around the year 2000."
A later, but thankfully much smaller, sewerage leak occurred nearby on 3 April 2011.

Culverting and flood alleviation works 
Corseting or embanking (to form dry land embankments known in the US as levees) mostly took place in the 20th century, along most of the course. The banks' width could be reduced due to water retained by the Canal Feeder. Local flood alleviation work has mostly taken place from the 1940s to the 1970s, as Brent's Tokyngton Park. Brentford's section has been modified, cleansed and dredged several times since the late 19th century.

The River Brent, proto-Brent River Park and surrounding area almost became a section of the Greater London Council's flood prevention scheme plans for Ealing in the 1970s. The Brent flood prevention scheme was finally completed in the 1980s.

The intermittent flooding in the 1970s was causing significant damage to buildings in Greenford's Costons Lane area and roads and parkland. The then controversial proposal was to channel the Brent into a concrete trough, possibly covered with a concrete lid, some 75 ft wide.
The planned scheme had allowed natural flood plains, away from housing, roads and riverside footpaths to soak up the excessive water flow to reduce the level of flooding through the passage of the flood water into the underlying ground water level.

Parts of the river's course that had been buried under concrete for most of the 20th century were planned to be uncovered to revitalise the area in 2008.

Environmental regeneration

The  Brent River and Canal Society (BRCS) 
The Brent River and Canal Society (BRCS) volunteer group was founded in 1972 by several Hanwell residents, led by  Luke Fitzherbert, under the umbrella of Hanwell Preservation Society, had taken the initiative to clear the river of two years' worth of dumped rubbish.

The society went on to campaign vigorously in the 1970s for the creation of Brent River Park, which was set up in 1975, saving it from use in Greater London Council's flood alleviation scheme plans for the London Borough of Ealing at the time. There were mostly plans to resolve extensive flooding which occurred periodically in the Perivale and Ealing areas. The Brent flood alleviation scheme was finally completed in the 1980s. Ultimately, this helped to achieve the Brent River and Canal Society objectives of a continuous urban walk along the river's course from Hanger Lane to Brentford. The first was Fitzherbert Walk, which passes over the river from Hanwell Bridge on the Uxbridge Road to where the river joins the Grand Union Canal opened in 1983 and was named after Luke Fitzherbert. A new footpath underneath the Wharncliffe Viaduct in Hanwell was opened in 1985 and is now part of the National Footpaths recognised walk, the Capital Ring.

Local community projects
There was a litter removal operation on the 19 and 20 August 2010, in Brent Lodge Park, Hanwell. Volunteers cleared up litter from river and banks to help improve the area for residents and wildlife. The clean-up was to be followed by some family fun activities from 1pm-5pm, including river dipping and refreshments.

School children from Alperton Community School were also involved in an Active Citizen Scheme along with the Environment Agency, to remind people not to pollute the Wealdstone Brook and River Brent through the abuse of the street surface water drains who conclude that littering, old plumbing and disposing of waste such as engine oil are destroying local fish spawning grounds.

February 2011 saw several community projects launched to clean up the River Brent to reduce the risk of damage to local fish spawning grounds.

River Brent Project regeneration scheme

The River Brent Project regeneration scheme is aimed at improving the local environment, wild live habitat and flood prevention.

Work at Tokyngton Park, Brent

The extensive flood prevention work undertaken during both the 1940s and 1970s had led to this section of river in Tokyngton Park in Tokyngton, Brent, being straightened and enclosed in concrete. The river thus provided little or no recreational value to the local populace, whilst the quality of wildlife habitat was poor. During 1999, a local partnership was formed between the local authority, the Environment agency, local community groups and local firms, to implement improvements to the park for both people and wildlife.

It was hoped that this provides a new lease of life for the river and enhances the quality of the local environment by removing the river from its concrete banks and to create an attractive public open space. The existing concrete river channelling and casing would be removed and the river's course modified to create new meanders in the middle area of the 'River Park' zone. The removal of some existing paths and provide new and the provision some new street furniture and a fixed fibre glass gazebo would also occur if further plans go forth.
It will also try to emphasise on community participation in the local project.

The Brent Cross Cricklewood development

Under plans for the Brent Cross Cricklewood development, the River Brent, which is currently (as of May 2011) in a 40-year-old concrete channel, and its tributary Clitterhouse Stream will be realigned and restored to a more natural state, incorporating a wetland environmental area and a public riverside walkway. Flood risk is to be reduced by restoring the flood plain and the addition of sustainable drainage, such as green roofs and water-permeable paving to reduce surface water, and thus flooding, in future times of heavy rain. New bridges over the river are to be designed so that they will be less easily blocked during a flood. According to the UK Government's Environment Agency, the development will provide opportunities to adapt the site to climate change, and give the community attractive recreational space and improved wildlife areas. Involved parties are Scott Wilson Group, RPS, ERM Consultants, Joseph Partners and the London Borough of Barnet.

Notable floods 
The earliest flood record is 1682.

 1682: A very violent storm of rain, accompanied with thunder and lightning, caused a sudden flood, which did great damage to the town of Brentford. The whole place was overflown; boats rowed up and down the streets, and several houses and other buildings were carried away by the force of the waters.
 1841: Brentford was flooded by the Brent Reservoir becoming overfull so that the overflow cut a breach in the earth dam. A wave of frothing and roaring water swept down the river's course taking all before it causing fatalities. Several people died.
 1976 and 1977: in the summer Britain saw drought and unusual heat with Water Companies declaring it would take six or seven years for empty reservoirs to recover.  The following August, a rainy spell was followed by a day and night of torrential rain that overwhelmed the Brent reservoir — authorities decided to open the sluice gates maximally at time of highest volume and pressure, to avoid costly overflow flooding, having been under general pressure to keep stock water supplies. Later, before the river below overflowed in many sections certain local sewers overflowed, some into homes. The streets, including arterial roads were jammed and local trains blocked. Hundreds of homes and businesses closed for the clean-up, with widespread press coverage.
 2007: August saw heavy rain cause a short bout of flash flooding in Brentford and Hanwell on roads, the Hounslow Loop Line and London Underground.
 2009: On 30 November, the Environment Agency warned residents of a flooding along River Brent from Hendon to Brentford, after a day of  notably heavy rain.  Several premises were temporarily flooded in Brentford and Perivale.

In literature and poetry 
Poet Laureate John Betjeman in his poem "Middlesex":

The anthropomorphic personification of the river appears as one of the daughters of Mama Thames in the novel Rivers of London.

Imagery

See also
 Tributaries of the River Thames
 List of rivers in England

Notes and references
Notes 
  
References

External links 
 River levels from Hendon to Brentford
 The Waterways of Brent . Accessed 2007-08-18

Brentford, London
Geography of the London Borough of Brent
Nature reserves in the London Borough of Barnet
Rivers of London
Subterranean rivers of London